The  (lit. New Hakone Road) is a 2-laned toll road in Hakone, Kanagawa, Japan. It is owned and managed by Central Nippon Expressway Company.

Overview

Officially the road is designated as a bypass for National Route 1. However unlike most other roads operated by Central Nippon Expressway Company, the Hakone Shindō is not designed for high speeds due to the steep gradient and sharp turns.

The road originates in the town of Hakone and follows a westerly course, ascending into mountainous areas. The road terminates at Hakone Pass, where the road meets the old Tōkaidō Highway and which serves as the boundary separating Kanagawa and Shizuoka Prefectures. Beyond Hakone Pass National Route 1 descends from the mountains into the city of Mishima to the west.

Tolls are collected at a toll plaza near the eastern terminus. The toll for a regular passenger car is 250 yen. Electronic Toll Collection (ETC) is accepted for payment, however no discount programs are in effect. Since there are no toll collection points between Hakonetōge Interchange and Ashinoko-Taikan Interchange this section of the road is effectively free.

List of interchanges and features

 IC - interchange, PA - parking area, BS - bus stop, TB - toll gate

See also
Hakone Turnpike, a high-speed bypass of Hakone Shindō

References

External links 
Central Nippon Expressway Company

Toll roads in Japan